The 22nd annual Berlin International Film Festival was held from 23 June to 4 July 1972. The Golden Bear was awarded to the Italian film I racconti di Canterbury directed by Pier Paolo Pasolini.

Jury
The following people were announced as being on the jury for the festival:
 Eleanor Perry, writer and screenwriter (United States) - Jury President
 Fritz Drobilitsch-Walden, writer, journalist and critic (Austria)
 Francis Cosne, writer and producer (France)
 Rita Tushingham, actress (United Kingdom)
 Tinto Brass, director and screenwriter (Italy)
 Yukichi Shinada, film critic (Japan)
 Julio Coll, director and screenwriter (Spain)
 Hans Hellmut Kirst, writer (West Germany)
 Herbert Oberscherningkat, journalist and producer (West Germany)

Films in competition
The following films were in competition for the Golden Bear award:

Key
{| class="wikitable" width="550" colspan="1"
| style="background:#FFDEAD;" align="center"| †
|Winner of the main award for best film in its section
|}

Awards

The following prizes were awarded by the Jury:
 Golden Bear: I racconti di Canterbury by Pier Paolo Pasolini
 Silver Bear for Best Director: Jean-Pierre Blanc for La Vieille Fille
 Silver Bear for Best Actress: Elizabeth Taylor for Hammersmith Is Out
 Silver Bear for Best Actor: Alberto Sordi for Detenuto in attesa di giudizio
 Silver Bear for an outstanding artistic achievement: Peter Ustinov for Hammersmith Is Out
 Silver Bear Extraordinary Jury Prize: The Hospital by Arthur Hiller

References

External links
 Berlin International Film Festival 1972
1972 Berlin International Film Festival
Berlin International Film Festival:1972 at Internet Movie Database

22
1972 film festivals
1972 in West Germany
1970s in West Berlin